Iván Carvajal Aguirre (born 1948 in San Gabriel, Ecuador) is an Ecuadorian poet, philosopher and writer. In 1984 he received Ecuador's National Prize for Literature, the "Aurelio Espinosa Pólit" prize, for his work entitled "Parajes". In February 2013 he won the Premio a las Libertades Juan Montalvo.

Carvajal lives in Quito, Ecuador, and works as a Professor at the Pontifical Catholic University of Ecuador. He directs País Secreto magazine and is project director of Corporación Cultural Orogenia.

Most of his work is devoted to poetry, though recently he has published some of his reflections on Ecuadorian poets ("A la zaga del animal imposible") and culture and politics in Ecuador ("¿Volver a tener patria?").

Bibliography

"Poemas de un mal tiempo para la lírica". Colección Populibros, Universidad Central. Quito, 1980.
"Del avatar". Colección Letras del Ecuador, C.C.E. del Guayas, 1981.
"Los amantes de Sumpa". Vivavida. Quito, 1984.
"Parajes". Ediciones de la Universidad Católica, EDUC. Quito, 1984. (National Prize for Literature "Aurelio Espinosa Pólit”, 1983)
"Material de lectura, Iván Carvajal". Dirección de Literatura, Coordinación de Difusión Cultural UNAM. México, 1991.
"En los labios / la celada". Eskeletra Editorial. Quito, 1996.
"Ópera". Quito, 1997. (Non-commercial, limited edition of 300 numbered books). 
"Inventando a Lennon". Ediciones Libri Mundi/Enrique Grosse-Luemern. Quito, 1997.
"Del avatar". Segunda Edición. Ediciones El Tábano. Quito, 1998.
"Los amantes de Sumpa". Second Edition. 
"La ofrenda del cerezo". Ediciones Libri Mundi/Enrique Grosse-Luemern. Quito, 2000.
"Tentativa y zozobra. Antología 1970- 2000". Visor Libros. Madrid, 2001.
"La casa del furor". La Poesía, señor hidalgo. Barcelona, 2004.
"Topologías". Dance, music and poetry Performance at Teatro Bolívar. Quito, 2005. (DVD Format)
"A la zaga del animal imposible. Lecturas de la poesía ecuatoriana del siglo XX". Serie Estudios Literarios y Culturales. Centro Cultural Benjamín Carrión. Quito, 2005.
"¿Volver a tener patria?". In “La cuadratura del círculo – cuatro ensayos sobre la cultura ecuatoriana”. Corporación Cultural Orogenia. Quito, 2006.

References

1948 births
Living people
People from San Gabriel, Ecuador
Ecuadorian poets
Ecuadorian male writers
Academic staff of the Pontifical Catholic University of Ecuador
20th-century Ecuadorian people